Knox / Henderson is a neighborhood in Dallas, Texas (USA).  It is north of the Uptown neighborhood and east and south of the enclave of Highland Park.  It is centered on Knox Street, Henderson Avenue, McKinney Avenue, and Cole Avenue.  The area is home to many bars, restaurants, and shops.  The Katy Trail also runs through the neighborhood.

Transportation

Highways 
  - North Central Expressway (US 75)

Education 
The district is zoned to schools in the Dallas Independent School District.

Residents of the district are zoned to Ben Milam Elementary School, Thomas J. Rusk Elementary School, and North Dallas High School.

References

External links
Knox District Official Site

Economy of Dallas